The men's 5000 metres at the 1974 European Athletics Championships was held in Rome, Italy, at Stadio Olimpico on 6 and 8 September 1974.

Medalists

Results

Final
8 September
This final was a fast race from the start, with Britain's Brendan Foster leading it all the way.  He passed 1,000 metres in 2:39.2.  In the early laps, Belgium's Willy Polleunis closely followed Foster, but soon after 1,000 metres the Belgian started to drop from the Briton's pace, and became the first runner to lose contact with the lead group.  Polleunis would finish fifteenth and last in this final.  Foster kept up the fast and steady pace, passing 2,000 metres in 5:20.2.  Finland's Lasse Viren had already moved behind Foster during the second kilometre, with East Germany's Manfred Kuschmann running third.  At 2,800 metres, Foster suddenly surged, and only Viren tried to keep up with him.  The British runner passed 3,000 metres in 8:01.2.  Viren slowed down before 3,100 metres, determined to conserve his strength to fight for the silver and bronze medals instead.  Therefore Foster ran the final's last laps in an unchallenged lead, while Viren let the main group of runners catch him.  On the last back straight, Kuschmann suddenly sprinted into the second place, followed by Viren, the Netherlands' Jos Hermens, Norway's Arne Kvalheim, and Romania's Ilie Floroiu.  At the start of the final bend, Hermens passed Viren.  However, on the final straight, the Finn was able to pass the Dutchman to claim the bronze medal behind Foster, who had already finished the race in 13:17.2, and Kuschmann who sprinted to the finish line in the second place.  (See Raevuori, Antero, Lasse Viren:  The Gilded Spikes / Kullatut piikkarit (Finland, c. 1976);  https://www.youtube.com/watch?v=tD3KLV7R4jA  EUROPEI DI ROMA 1974 5000 FOSTER.)

Heats
6 September

Heat 1

Heat 2

Heat 3

Participation
According to an unofficial count, 26 athletes from 18 countries participated in the event.

 (3)
 (2)
 (1)
 (2)
 (1)
 (1)
 (1)
 (1)
 (3)
 (1)
 (1)
 (1)
 (1)
 (1)
 (1)
 (3)
 (1)
 (1)

References

5000 metres
5000 metres at the European Athletics Championships